The Canterbury Provincial Council Buildings were the buildings of the Canterbury Provincial Council that administered the Canterbury Province from 1853 until the abolition of provincial government in 1876. The buildings are the only purpose-built provincial government buildings in New Zealand still in existence. The buildings were substantially damaged in the February 2011 Christchurch earthquake, and partially demolished by the Christchurch City Council.

Location

The buildings are located in Christchurch Central City. They occupy the block surrounded by Armagh Street, Durham Street, Gloucester Street and the Avon River.

Historical context

The New Zealand Constitution Act 1852, passed by the Parliament of the United Kingdom, established a bicameral New Zealand Parliament, with the lower house (the House of Representatives) being elected by popular vote, and the upper house (the Legislative Council) being appointed. Votes were to be cast under a simple FPP system by telling ones choice of candidate to the election officer, as the secret ballot had not yet been introduced. The legislation also introduced provincial government, with an initial six provinces (and ultimately ten). At the time of the 1853 election, there were no political parties in New Zealand. As such, all candidates were independents. Provincial governments and the House of Representatives were elected around the same time in 1853. Provincial governments were led by a Superintendent, who were elected separately.

Building history

The foundation stone for the first building was laid in January 1858. The first set of buildings were a two-storey timber building, forming an L shape along the Durham Street frontage, with the Timber Chamber, modelled on 14th and 16th century English manorial halls, the meeting room for the Provincial Council. The Timber Chamber was behind the street frontage and was first used in September 1859. An extension to the north had already been commissioned at that time, which was opened in 1861. This extension was along Durham and Armagh Streets and, together with the existing buildings, formed a courtyard. The third and last set of buildings was constructed in 1864–1865. The Stone Chamber was the new meeting room for the council; it was larger than the Timber Chamber to cope with an increased size of the council. Its interior is described as provincial architect Benjamin Mountfort's most impressive achievement. Bellamy's, the refreshment rooms, were added to the back of the Timber Chamber.

The buildings are the only purpose-built provincial government buildings in New Zealand still in existence these days. The other remaining building is that of the Southland Province in Invercargill, which was built in 1864 as a Masonic lodge and was purchased by the Southland Provincial Council as their council chambers in 1866.

Earthquake damage

The buildings were substantially damaged in the February 2011 Christchurch earthquake. The stone tower on Armagh Street, which acted as the buildings' entrance on their north side and which held the clock of the Victoria Clock Tower in the early years, collapsed. Dr Ian Lochhead, Associate Professor of Art History at the University of Canterbury, said that the Stone Chamber was for many the single biggest heritage loss of the February earthquake. Lochhead, who was an advisor for the restoration of the buildings from 1981, called for the reconstruction of the Stone Chamber. Detailed engineering assessments showed that the buildings received so much damage that significant portions would have to be rebuilt. A report was due to be given to Christchurch City Councillors in June 2013 outlining the options.

References

Heritage New Zealand Category 1 historic places in Canterbury, New Zealand
Buildings and structures in Christchurch
Tourist attractions in Christchurch
2011 Christchurch earthquake
Christchurch Central City
Benjamin Mountfort buildings
1850s architecture in New Zealand